People from Iași, Romania.

Natives

A 
 Vasile Adamachi
 Elena Albu
 Dimitrie Alexandresco
 Jean Ancel
 Cabiria Andreian Cazacu
 George Assaky
 Teodor Axinte

B 
 Gheorghe Bănciulescu
 Monica Bîrlădeanu
 H. Bonciu
 Octav Botez
 Gheorghe Brăescu
 Dumitru Bughici
 Simion Bughici
 Mihail Gheorghiu Bujor
 Theodor Burghele

C 
 Ottoi Călin
 Gheorghe Călugăreanu
 Liviu Cangeopol
 Ion C. Cantacuzino (politician)
 Gheorghe Caranda
 Petre P. Carp
 Lascăr Catargiu
 Eduard Caudella
 Alexandru Cazaban
 Maria Chefaliady-Taban
 Maria Cicherschi Ropală
 Ioana Ciolacu
 Petru Comarnescu
 Roxana Cogianu
 Roxana Condurache
 Grigore Constantinescu
 Adrian Covic
 Florentin Crihălmeanu
 Mihail Cruceanu
 Ioan Petru Culianu
 Nicolae Culianu
 A. C. Cuza
 Elena Cuza

D 
 Nichita Danilov
 Alexandra Dariescu
 Liviu Deleanu
 Constantin Dimitrescu-Iași
 Cornelia Druțu
 Nicolae Dunca

E 
 Joseph Edelstein
 Pauline Edelstein
 Fernanda Eliscu
 Ștefan Emilian
 Constantin Eraclide
 Sorel Etrog
 Eren Eyüboğlu

F 
 Samson Fainsilber
 Anastasie Fătu
 Bonifaciu Florescu
 Cristina Flutur
 Benjamin Fondane

G 
 Matyla Ghyka
 Alma Gluck
 Dimitrie Gusti

H 
 Spiru Haret
 Alfred Hefter
 Philip Herschkowitz
 Alexandru Hrisoverghi

I 
 Magda Ianculescu
 Eleny Ionel
 Ilarion Ionescu-Galați

J 
 Alexandru Jar
 Hilda Jerea

K 
 Alexandros Kantakouzinos
 Antioch Kantemir
 Leon Klepper
 Rita Klímová
 Mihail Kogălniceanu
 Jordaki Kuparenko

L 
 Samuel Leibowitz
 Ovidiu Lipan
 Magda Lupescu

M 
 Radu Manicatide
 Mioara Mantale
 Lucia Mantu
 Gheorghe Mărdărescu
 Julie Mayaya
 Constantin Mille
 Mărgărita Miller Verghy
 Cristian Mungiu
 Alina Mungiu-Pippidi
 Andrei Muraru
 Florica Musicescu

N 
 Anton Naum
 Costache Negri
 Leon C. Negruzzi
 Bernardo Neustadt
 Margareta Niculescu

P 
 George Emil Palade
 Theodor Pallady
 Petre P. Panaitescu
 George Panu
 Alexandru A. Philippide
 Lupu Pick
 Ilie Pintilie
 Vasile Pogor
 Ilie Popa
 Gheorghe Popovici
 Maricica Puică

R 
 Emil Racoviță
 Prince Radu of Romania
 I. M. Rașcu
 Oswald von Richthofen
 Raluca Ripan
 Mendi Rodan
 Alexandru Romalo
 Arnold Rosé
 Eduard Rosé
 Meir Rosenne
 Nicolae Rosetti-Bălănescu
 Radu Rosetti

S 
 Elias Schwarzfeld
 Arthur Segal
 Matei Socor
 Maurice Solovine
 Gheorghe Spacu
 Constantin Stamati
 Dimitrie Sturdza
 Grigore Sturdza
 Mihail Sturdza
 Corneliu Șumuleanu
 Rodica Sutzu

T 
 Ionel Teodoreanu
 Iancu Țucărman

U 
 Mihai Răzvan Ungureanu

V 
 Radu Varia
 Nicolae Vogoride
 Eugeniu Voinescu
 Lascăr Vorel

W 
 Max Wexler

X 
 Adela Xenopol
 Alexandru Dimitrie Xenopol
 Margareta Xenopol
 Nicolae Xenopol

Y 
 Leon Rene Yankwich

Z 
 Paul Zarifopol
 Ovidiu Zotta

Residents 
 Ion Creangă
 Mihai Eminescu
 Dan Lungu
 Jacob Itzhak Niemirower
 Mendi Rodan

 
Iasi